Eunice aphroditois is a benthic bristle worm of warm marine waters. It lives mainly in the Atlantic Ocean, but can also be found in the Indo-Pacific. Its iridescent cuticle produces a wide range of colors, from black to purple. This species is an ambush-predator; it hunts by burrowing its whole body in soft sediment on the ocean floor and waiting until its antennae detect prey. It then strikes with its sharp mouthparts. It may also be found among coral reefs.

E. aphroditois is commonly known as the sand-striker or bobbit-worm;Black, Riley, Giant predatory worms lurked beneath the ancient seafloor, fossils reveal, National Geographic, January 21, 2021 the latter name is from the John and Lorena Bobbitt case.

Description

These ambush predators have no eyes and five antennae on their head that are used to sense prey. The body is covered by a hard exoskeleton. The mandibles can be retracted inside the body and are responsible for striking and stunning prey; they are capable of snapping some prey in half. Typically, E. aphroditois ranges from deep purple to black, along with metallic colors. The largest known specimen on record reached 299 centimeters (9.81 ft) in length, making it the longest known member of the polychaete class. Despite these great lengths, the worms are slim, with the body only about 25.5 millimeters (1.00 in) wide.

Habitat
This species may be found prowling among the prey-rich environment of coral reefs, where its coloration allows it to blend in and its slim body enables it to hunt in tight places. It inhabits a wide range of other habitats, particularly sandy and muddy sediments, as well as around rocks and sponges. It has been recorded at depths of up to 95 meters.

Diet and interactions
E. aphroditois senses passing prey with its antennae, seizes the prey with its mouth, and drags it into its burrow. To reduce predation risk, some fish engage in mobbing behavior, during which a group of fish will direct jets of water into the worm's burrow to disorient it. This species is not only considered to be a carnivore, feeding on a plethora of species of fish, but it can also be considered an herbivore/omnivore, feeding on algae, as well as a decomposer, feeding on dead and decaying matter.

Ancestral species may have exhibited the same hunting-behavior twenty million years ago, according to fossil-records.

Life-cycle
Like most of the class Polychaeta, E. aphroditois is a sexually-reproducing organism that lacks external reproductive organs. During spawning, female polychaetes produce a pheromone that attracts males and causes them to release sperm; this in turn triggers the female to release eggs into the water, where fertilization occurs. Few offspring survive to adulthood because often, the eggs are eaten by other animals or destroyed.

The lifespan of E. aphroditois is believed to be three to five years.

Regeneration
Like many species of bristle worm, E. aphroditois can also reproduce asexually by splitting into multiple segments, then regenerating body parts such as the head or tail. This enables them to survive being attacked by predators.

Aquaculture
While not commonly kept in aquaculture, individuals of E. aphroditois are occasionally found in home aquaria, where smaller specimens can evade detection by being transported into the tank in live rocks, where they then grow in size. As E. aphroditois hunts fish, it cannot be kept as part of a community tank and should be removed when found, as it will deplete the aquarium's stock by direct predation.

E. aphroditois can be difficult to remove from aquariums due to their abilities to split into new individuals when handled, dig holes into rocks, and curl up and hide in small rocks despite their length.

References

Errantia
Animals described in 1788
Fauna of the Indian Ocean